Water polo was contested for men only at the 1983 Pan American Games in Caracas, Venezuela.

Competing teams
Eight teams contested the event.

Medalists

References

 Pan American Games water polo medalists on HickokSports

P
1983
Events at the 1983 Pan American Games
1983